Timothy Daniel Herron (born February 6, 1970) is an American professional golfer. He currently plays on the PGA Tour Champions. He was previously a member of the PGA Tour, where he was a four-time winner.

Early life
Herron was born in Minneapolis, Minnesota. His father and grandfather, both named Carson Herron, were professional golfers who played in the U.S. Open.

Amateur career 
Herron was a 1992-1993 first team All-American at the University of New Mexico. He won the 1992 Minnesota State Amateur. Herron played on the 1993 United States Walker Cup team.

Professional career 
In 1993, Herron turned professional. He played on the Nationwide Tour in 1995, and the following season he won for the first time on the PGA Tour at the Honda Classic. He won three times in his first four seasons at the top level. Herron continued to play consistently after that, but there was a seven-year gap before he claimed his fourth PGA Tour title at the 2006 Bank of America Colonial. His best finish in a major championship is a solo 6th-place finish in the 1999 U.S. Open. In 2000, Herron was as high as 29th in the Official World Golf Rankings.

Herron has played in 560 PGA Tour events through 2019 and won more than $19.6 million during his career, but has not been fully exempt on the PGA Tour since 2012.

Personal life 
Herron resides in Wayzata, Minnesota with his three children: Carson, Mick, and Patrick.

Herron has a genetic condition called Dupuytren's contracture, which affected his father and sister. Herron's younger sister Alissa (married name Super) is also an accomplished golfer; she won the 1999 U.S. Women's Mid-Amateur title, won several Minnesota state titles, is a member of the Minnesota Golf Hall of Fame, and has served as her brother's agent.

Amateur wins 

 1992 Minnesota State Amateur

Professional wins (4)

PGA Tour wins (4)

PGA Tour playoff record (2–1)

Playoff record
Other playoff record (0–1)

Results in major championships

CUT = missed the half-way cut
"T" = tied

Summary

Most consecutive cuts made – 5 (1998 U.S. Open – 1999 Open Championship)
Longest streak of top-10s – 1

Results in The Players Championship

CUT = missed the halfway cut
"T" indicates a tie for a place

Results in World Golf Championships

1Cancelled due to 9/11

QF, R16, R32, R64 = Round in which player lost in match play
"T" = Tied
NT = No tournament

Results in senior major championships

"T" indicates a tie for a place
NT = No tournament due to COVID-19 pandemic

U.S. national team appearances
Amateur
Walker Cup: 1993 (winners)

See also
1995 PGA Tour Qualifying School graduates

References

External links

golflink.com: About Tim Herron

American male golfers
New Mexico Lobos men's golfers
PGA Tour golfers
Golfers from Minneapolis
People from Wayzata, Minnesota
1970 births
Living people